Samuel Prakel (born 29 October 1994) is an American middle- and long-distance runner, who competes for Adidas. His personal best time in the indoor mile is 3:50.94, tied for 13th all-time. He competed collegiately for the Oregon Ducks, where he was a five-time All American and won the 1500m at the 2018 Pac-12 Championships.

High school career 
Prakel attended Versailles High School in Ohio. During his time there he was a two-time Ohio Division III state champion in cross country winning the race in 2011 and 2012. His senior year he was a Footlocker Nationals qualifier and won Ohio Gatorade Cross Country Runner of the Year. 

On the track, Prakel was a four-time state champion winning the 3200m in 2012, the 800m in 2013, and the 1600m in both 2012 and 2013. Immediately after his senior season he finished third in the 1,500 meters at the 2013 U.S. Junior Championships running a 3:46.93.

Collegiate career 
Parker attended the University of Oregon training alongside teammates such as Edward Cheserek, Eric Jenkins, Mac Fleet, and Cooper Teare among others. He finished his time there as a five-time All-American and the 2018 Pac-12 1,500m Champion.

Professional career 
On July 31, 2018 he announced via an Instagram post he had signed a professional contract with Adidas.

In March 2022 Prakel represented the United States at the 2022 World Athletics Indoor Championships in Belgrade, Serbia where he ran a 3:38.40 1500m, finishing 9th overall.

At the 2023 USA Indoor Track and Field Championships, Prakel won both the 1500m and 3000m. However, Prakel initally finished second in the 1500m to Josh Thompson, who waa later disqualified for inhibiting Henry Wynne in the final 100 meters, with Prakel therefore given the title.

Personal bests

References

External links
 
 SAM PRAKEL University of Washington Volunteer Assistant Coach, Distances

1994 births
Living people
American male middle-distance runners
American male long-distance runners
Oregon Ducks men's track and field athletes
Oregon Ducks men's cross country runners
Track and field athletes from Ohio